Marcus Tullius Cicero Minor, or Cicero the Younger, was born in 64 or 65 BC. He was the son of Marcus Tullius Cicero, who as a distinguished orator and consular senator was one of the leading figures of the Roman Republic during the 1st century BC, and his first wife, Terentia. Cicero Minor had an elder sister, Tullia, who was born in 79 BC and died in 45 BC.

In the beginning Cicero wished to have a military career. On the outbreak of Caesar's Civil War in 49 BC, he joined the side of Pompey like his father. After Pompey's defeat by Julius Caesar at Pharsalus in 48 BC, Cicero Minor was pardoned by Caesar.

Cicero was sent off to Athens by his father to learn philosophy. While he was at Athens he wrote a letter to Tiro, a slave and later freedman of the Cicero family, in which he said that he was practising declamation in Greek with Gorgias but had to let him go, because his father, whom he did not want to offend, had told him to. Cicero Minor was then taught declamation in Greek by Cassius, and Latin with Brutus,  the two leading conspirators in the assassination of Julius Caesar who, their deed complete, were in Greece trying to gain support for the war against the Second Triumvirate. Brutus praised Cicero and admired him for his noble spirit and his detestation of tyranny. During his time in Athens, Brutus gave Cicero command and used his services in a number of successful undertakings.

After his father was murdered in 43 BC on the orders of Mark Antony, Cicero joined up with the army of Liberatores led by Cassius and Brutus. Brutus had recruited Cicero to help keep Greece under control. After their defeat at the Battle of Philippi in 42 BC, Octavian pardoned Cicero and they worked together in the forthcoming struggle against Antony.  Cicero subsequently became an augur.

Cicero participated in the Battle of Actium in 31 BC, where Octavian defeated Antony, who later committed suicide.

Cicero became one of the suffect consuls for 30 BC and announced Antony's death to the senate. He was appointed governor of the imperial province of Syria and the proconsul of Asia. Cicero also revoked the honours of Antony and had all his statues removed, as well as decreeing that no member of the family would ever bear the name Marcus again. "In this way Heaven entrusted the family of Cicero the final acts in the punishment of Antony." The last record of Cicero the Younger is his appointment as second legate to Syria in 28 BC.

Resources

 Plutarch - Cicero and Brutus

External links
 
 Marcus Tullius Cicero the younger entry in historical sourcebook by Mahlon H. Smith

65 BC births
1st-century BC clergy
1st-century BC Roman governors of Syria
1st-century BC Roman consuls
Roman-era students in Athens
Roman governors of Asia
Tullii
Year of death unknown